Franz Eibler (19 May 1924 – 3 March 2010) was an Austrian weightlifter. He competed in the men's heavyweight event at the 1948 Summer Olympics.

References

1924 births
2010 deaths
Austrian male weightlifters
Olympic weightlifters of Austria
Weightlifters at the 1948 Summer Olympics
Place of birth missing